A list of films produced in the United Kingdom in 1968 (see 1968 in film):

1968

See also
1968 in British music
1968 in British radio
1968 in British television
1968 in the United Kingdom

References

External links

1968
Films
Lists of 1968 films by country or language